Chichimeca Jonaz may refer to:

 Chichimeca Jonaz people, an ethnic group of Mexico
 Chichimeca Jonaz language, a language of Mexico

See also 
 Chichimeca, a historic group of peoples

Language and nationality disambiguation pages